Roger Mark Goldsworthy (born 24 September 1956) is an Australian politician who was the member for the electoral district of Kavel from 2002 to 2018, representing the Liberal Party.

Prior to his election into politics, Goldsworthy received an ANZ Banking Group Ltd Diploma in Management as well as Certificates in Accounting and Finance. After his studies he became an electorate officer and political adviser, as well as being a member of many school committees, and sporting and community groups.

In the 2006 election, Goldsworthy increased his margin to 9.4% after Tom Playford changed from being an independent in 2002 to Family First in 2006.

Goldsworthy is the son of Roger Goldsworthy, former Deputy Premier in the 18 September 1979 to 10 November 1982 Liberal government of David Tonkin. Roger was also the first member for Kavel.

Goldsworthy did not re-contest his seat at the 2018 election.

References

External links

Poll Bludger article

Members of the South Australian House of Assembly
Liberal Party of Australia members of the Parliament of South Australia
Australian people of Cornish descent
1956 births
Living people
21st-century Australian politicians